Yelchin (Russian: Ельчин) is a Russian family name. Notable people with the surname include:

Anton Yelchin (1989–2016), American actor
Eugene Yelchin (born 1956), Russian-American illustrator and author, and uncle of Anton

See also
Yeltsin (surname)
Russian-language surnames